The Macchi M.67, was an Italian racing seaplane designed by Mario Castoldi and built by Macchi for the 1929 Schneider Trophy race.

Design and development
Castoldi based the design of the M.67, (a single-seat, low-wing, monoplane, twin-float floatplane), on that of the earlier Macchi M.39, which had competed for Italy in the 1926 and 1927 Schneider Trophy races, following the M.39s layout but strengthened to accommodate the 18-cylinder,  Isotta-Fraschini Asso 1000("Ace") 1000 W-18 engine, a much bigger and more powerful engine than the Fiat AS.2 V12 fitted to the M.39. The M.67 carried fuel in its floats; the powerful engine drove a three-bladed propeller which created a large amount of torque. To provide extra flotation allowing smaller floats, lighter structure and less drag, fuel was carried in integral tanks built into the floats. To counter the high torque from the propeller, more fuel was carried in one float than the other, reducing swing on take-off dramatically due to reduced asymmetric hydro-dynamic drag, but also causing high out of trim forces in roll when airborne.

Although the Italian public expressed a great deal of concern that the Asso 1000 engine was not ready for Schneider Trophy competition—Isotta-Fraschini built 27 of them for the 1929 Schneider Trophy race, but some exploded during testing—the Italian Air Minister, Italo Balbo (1896–1940), believed that the M.67 had the best chance of winning the race and selected it to represent Italy. Macchi built three M.67s.

Operational history
 The M.67s underwent testing on Lake Garda in northern Italy.  In August 1929 Regia Aeronautica (Italian Royal Air Force) Captain Giuseppe Motta was killed when his M.67 suddenly dived into the lake during a test flight in which he reached 583 kilometers per hour (362 miles per hour). Italy asked the 1929 races hosts, the British Royal Aero Club, to postpone the race to allow Italy to correct the flaws in the M.67 and Asso 1000 engine, but the British refused. The Italians decided to enter the two surviving M.67s in the race despite the risk to their pilots, Balbo announcing that "the Italian team is going to England merely to perform a gesture of chivalrous sportsmanship." Italy also entered a Macchi M.52R floatplane in the race.

The race took place at Calshot Spit in the United Kingdom and began on 7 September 1929, with Lieutenants Remo Cadringher and Giovanni Monti flying the two M.67s.

The M.52R completed the race, taking second place. During the banquet celebrating the end of the race, Balbo said, "We have finished playing our part as sportsmen. Tomorrow our work as competitors will begin," signalling Italy's intention to be more competitive in the next Schneider Trophy race, scheduled for 1931.

Preserved aircraft
An M.67 is preserved in Italy at the Museo storico dell'Aeronautica Militare di Vigna di Valle.

Operators

Specifications

See also

References
Notes

Bibliography

 Angelucci, Enzo. World Encyclopedia of Civil Aircraft. London: Willow Books, 1984. .
 Donald, David, ed. The Complete Encyclopedia of World Aircraft. New York: Barnes & Noble Books, 1997. .
 Eves, Edward. The Schneider Trophy Story. Shrewsbury, UK. Airlife Publishing Ltd., 2001. .
 The Illustrated Encyclopedia of Aircraft (Part Work 1982–1985). London: Orbis Publishing, 1985.
 Taylor, Michael J. H. Jane's Encyclopedia of Aviation. London: Studio Editions, 1989. .
 Vašiček, Radko. "When Seaplanes Ruled the Sky." Aviation History, September 2002.

External links

Newsreel footage of 1929 Schneider Trophy racing teams, British Supermarine S.6A aircraft (#2 and #8), and Italian Macchi M.67 (#10) and Macchi M.52R (#4) aircraft at 1929 Schneider Trophy race 

M.67
Floatplanes
1920s Italian sport aircraft
Schneider Trophy
Racing aircraft
Low-wing aircraft
Single-engined tractor aircraft
Aircraft first flown in 1929